Titus the Fox: To Marrakech and Back is a side-scrolling platform game developed by Titus France for the Amiga, Amstrad CPC, Atari ST, and MS-DOS. The game was originally released in 1991 under the name Lagaf': Les Aventures de Moktar — Vol 1: La Zoubida, featuring French comedian Lagaf' as a tie-in with his song "La Zoubida". For the international edition, Titus retooled the game to feature its mascot and released the game as Titus the Fox: To Marrakech and Back in 1992.

Gameplay

Titus's beloved Suzy has been kidnapped on the other side of the Sahara desert, and to get her back the player must advance through 15 levels. The goal is to avoid dogs, construction workers, giant bees, and other creatures. The player can fight back by throwing objects back at them or picking walking enemies up from behind and throwing them as projectiles at other obstacles. Stacking thrown objects is often required to get to the end of most levels. The game uses a code-based "saving" system, with the codes calculated uniquely for each machine.

Ports
In the Game Boy Color version, the ability to stand on thrown objects as well as throw enemies was removed. Players could no longer enter through doorways in levels and a new gimmick was added that would cause walls and ladders to appear if the player walked on their invisible activation space. Also added were bonus stages where between levels which consisted of a linear path where the player picks up golden boxes which would increase their score.

Reception

Power Unlimited gave the game boy version a review score of 80% and praised the game commenting: "Titus the Fox is an inventive little platform game full of surprises. The picture is clear, and you can even play it in pairs. Well suited for the Game Boy."

References

External links
Titus The Fox: To Marrakech And Back at Atari Mania
Titus The Fox: To Marrakech And Back at Amiga Hall of Light

1991 video games
DOS games
Amiga games
Platform games
Atari ST games
Game Boy games
Amstrad CPC games
Titus Software games
Game Boy Color games
Video games based on Arabian mythology
Video games about foxes
Video games set in Morocco
Video games developed in France